Dimos Milonas (Greek: Δήμος Μυλωνάς) is a Greek singer and actor. After high school graduation he went to law school. After two years, his father forced him to quit because he was failing his classes. Later he enrolled in drama school and graduated with excellent grades. After his graduation, he started at several plays. With his rise of popularity, many famous actors wanted to work with him, Aliki vougiouklaki was one of them. In the 90s he hosted the morning show Πρωινός Καφές. Even though he was very famous at that time, his parents never approved his acting career. After a trip to Los Angeles, he was blinded by the American industry and got on a high horse. A year later, he returned to Greece and began to work again but he developed a drinking addiction and his career quickly faded away. In the 00s he started writing lyrics for Greek singers and he rose to fame once again, but his drinking problem made him quit and disappeared.  He is most famous for his debut album "Είχα Πάει... Λαϊκή!".

Personal life

He was married three times. He has a son from his second marriage; they were never really close and always had a troubled relationship. In 2018 he married Fotini Constantinides (filled for divorce).

Discography

Albums

References

20th-century Greek male singers
20th-century Greek male actors
21st-century Greek male actors
1961 births
Living people
Male actors from Athens